John Paul Papanicolaou (1949 – 14 February 2010) was a Greek businessman active in the shipping industry. A friend of the Onassis family, he is best known for his purchase and restoration of the Onassis yacht, Christina O in 1998, adding the O. to the ship's name. He also purchased the now decaying former Yugoslavian presidential yacht Galeb, which was the third largest yacht in the world at one time. 

John-Paul Papanicolaou died in Athens, Greece on February 14, 2010 after two years with cancer.

References 

1949 births
2010 deaths
Deaths from cancer in Greece
Greek businesspeople